Joseph Adam Pikula, Sr. (May 5, 1944 – April 29, 2015) was a Canadian football player who played for the Hamilton Tiger-Cats. He won the Grey Cup with them in 1963. He played high school football at the St. John's College in Brantford, Ontario and was the third player to go from playing high school football directly to the CFL. A back injury forced his retirement from football in 1964. He is a member of the Wayne Gretzky Sports Centre Hall of Recognition (1984).

Pikula died on April 29, 2015 in Brantford, Ontario, from cancer.

References

1944 births
2015 deaths
Hamilton Tiger-Cats players
Players of Canadian football from Ontario
Sportspeople from Brantford